Lukinskaya is a rural locality (a village) in Verkhnetoyemsky District, Arkhangelsk Oblast, Russia. The population was 26 as of 2010.

Geography 
Lukinskaya is located on the Nizhnyaya Toyma River, 62 km northwest of Verkhnyaya Toyma (the district's administrative centre) by road. Mitroninskaya is the nearest rural locality.

References 

Rural localities in Verkhnetoyemsky District